The Lumber Exchange Building was the first skyscraper built in Minneapolis, Minnesota, United States, dating to 1885. It was designed in the Richardsonian Romanesque style by Franklin B. Long and Frederick Kees and was billed as one of the first fireproof buildings in the country.  It is the oldest high-rise building standing in Minneapolis, and is the oldest building outside of New York City with 12 or more floors.

Franklin Long had formerly worked with Charles F. Haglin, while Frederick Kees had worked with Leroy Buffington for about four years. The partnership of Long and Kees, lasting from 1884 to 1897, was particularly successful and led to the construction of many of the largest buildings in the city in the 1880s and 1890s. Other buildings by these partners included the Public Library (1884), Masonic Temple (1888) (now the Hennepin Center for the Arts), Flour Exchange (1893–1897), Minneapolis City Hall (1889), and the Kasota Block (1884).

The building was built in multiple stages. Originally a tall, thin structure, an additional wing was added in 1890. Later, two stories were added at the top of the building. James Lileks, Minneapolis writer and architectural critic, says, 

The Lumber Exchange Building was listed on the National Register of Historic Places in 1983.

References

External links

Lumber Exchange Building at the Hennepin County Library
Lumber Exchange Building at the Minnesota Historical Society

Commercial buildings on the National Register of Historic Places in Minnesota
Commodity exchanges in the United States
National Register of Historic Places in Minneapolis
Richardsonian Romanesque architecture in Minnesota
Skyscraper office buildings in Minneapolis
Office buildings completed in 1885